Dr. Kodaganur S. Gopinath, MS, FAMS, FRCS (Edin) is an Indian surgical oncologist, known for his pioneering work on oncological research. He is a recipient of many awards including Dr. B. C. Roy Award, considered to be the premier medical honour in the country. The President of India recognised his services to the field of oncology, by awarding him the fourth highest civilian award, Padma Shri, in 2010.

Biography
{{quotebox|align = left|qalign=center|width=24em|I owe almost everything to my sister, Vimala," Dr Gopinath said on joining Kidwai Memorial Institute of Oncology, She supported me after my father. She had read about the vacancy in Kidwai and called me here}}
Kodaganur S. Gopinath was born in Davangere, a small town in Karnataka and had humble beginnings. He had his early schooling at St Paul's Convent School and joined JJM Medical College, Davangere, in 1968, to secure his MBBS degree with third rank, in 1975. Higher studies in general surgery (MS) was done at the King Edward Memorial Hospital and Seth Gordhandas Sunderdas Medical College, Mumbai. Later, he obtained FRCS from the Royal College of Surgeons of Edinburgh and FAMS from the National Academy of Medical Sciences, New Delhi.

On his return from Edinburgh, Dr. Gopinath joined Kidwai Memorial Institute of Oncology, Bangalore as a surgical oncologist where he stayed till he started the work on the Bangalore Institute of Oncology in 1989. He is the Director of Healthcare Global Enterprise (HCG), one of the world's largest cancer care providers and the Director and Consultant Surgical Oncologist at the Bangalore Institute of Oncology and Ambuja Health Care.

Dr. Gopinath is married to a college lecturer, Kusum, and the couple has a son, Srinivas and a daughter, Sindhura. The family resides in Bangalore. Srinivas is a Thoracic Oncology Fellow at Tata Memorial Centre in Mumbai and is recently married. Sindhura is pursuing her PhD in cancer biology at Icahn School of Medicine at Mount Sinai in New York City.

Legacy
Dr. Gopinath founded the Bangalore Institute of Oncology where he is working as the Director and Consultant Surgical Oncologist. He is known to have done extensive research on oncology with special emphasis on the surgery of head and neck, comparative study of laparoscopic and conventional surgical methods, cancer of the rectum and the impact of yoga on cancer. He is also regarded as a specialist in the treatment of breast cancer.

Positions
 2018 - 2020, President International College of Surgeons, Indian Section 
 2016 - Till Now, Board of Director Asian Oncology Society
 2013 - 2016 Editorial Board Annals of Surgical Oncology, USA
 2010 - Till Now - Chairman / Editor Indian Journal of Surgical Oncology 2006 – President, Association of Surgeons of India, Chennai
 2003–2004 – President, Indian Association of Surgical Oncologists
 2000 – till date – President, Ostamates India, Bangalore
 2000–2004 – Vice-president, Indian society of oncology
 Chairman – Association Surgeons of India, Karnataka chapter
 2000–2006 – Joint editor, Indian journal of Surgery
 1994–2000 – Governing Council Member – Association of Surgeons of India
 1996 – Member – Scientific Advisory Committee (ICMR), New Delhi

Awards and recognitions
 Professor B G Jirge Memorial Oration - 2018
 Professor S Krishnamurthy Memorial Oration - Tamilnadu - 2018 
 Professor Balakrishna Rao Oration of Association of Surgeons of India - 2014
 Professor K P Bhargav Memorial Award - 2013 
 Padma Shri – 2010
 Honorary FRCS, Royal College of Surgeons of Edinburgh
 Honorary FAMS National Academy of Medical Sciences, New Delhi – 2004
 Dr. B. C. Roy Award – 2008
 Rajoytsava Award – 2005
 Association of Surgeons of India Award
 Vikas Rathna Award – the International Friendship Society, New Delhi
 Mammadi Saudaver'' Travelling Fellowship in Oncology – 1987.
 Best Citizen Award – Lions Club, Peenya – 2002

Publications
Dr. Gopinath has published several articles related to oncological studies.

References

External links
 Bio on the New Indian Express
  Reference on NEJM
 Reference on Microsoft Academic Search
 Book Appointments with Dr Kodaganur S Gopinath

Living people
Recipients of the Padma Shri in medicine
Indian surgeons
Indian oncologists
Medical doctors from Bangalore
Dr. B. C. Roy Award winners
Fellows of the National Academy of Medical Sciences
People from Davanagere district
20th-century Indian medical doctors
Year of birth missing (living people)
20th-century surgeons